Dichanthelium scabriusculum common names tall swamp rosette-panicgrass, tall swamp panicgrass, rough panic-grass and panic grass, is a species of plant found in North America. It is listed as endangered in Connecticut,  Maryland, and New York (state). It is listed as threatened in Massachusetts.

References

scabriusculum